Bay City News is a news agency based in the San Francisco Bay Area that focuses on general interest news. It employs about 25 reporters and editors and is overseen by veteran journalist Katherine Ann Rowlands.

History
Established in 1979, Bay City News employs about 25 reporters and editors who cover the greater San Francisco Bay Area. The service feeds 100 TV, radio, print and digital newsrooms around the clock. It also serves businesses, PR firms and government agencies in need of information about where people live, work and play in the nine-county area. As the region's only general-interest wire service, Bay City News plays a vital role in keeping communities informed, whether it be through breaking news reports, up-to-date disaster information, civic affairs, public event coverage, or updates on local criminal and appellate court cases. It also covers the big topics of the day, including housing, transportation, immigration and the environment. The company has a nonprofit affiliate, Bay City News Foundation, which uses philanthropic support to fill the news gaps in the region and publish community stories at LocalNewsMatters.org.

In 2018, journalist Katherine Ann Rowlands, a Berkeley, California native and John S. Knight Journalism Fellow at Stanford University, purchased the company.

Richard Fogel (1923–2009), one of the three founders, helped craft principles of the Freedom of Information Act. He also served as chairman of the National Freedom of Information Committee of the Society of Professional Journalists. In 1989, Fogel was awarded the James Madison Freedom of Information Career Achievement Award. As Fogel worked as editor and publisher, his wife Marcia ran the entertainment coverage and partner Wayne Futak served as general manager until he sold the company in 2018.

Newsrooms that subscribe
Bay City News counts nearly 100 subscribers among its clients, from TV stations such as KGO-TV Channel 7 to radio broadcasters such as KCBS Radio, to newspapers such as the San Jose Mercury News and The New York Times.

The service also serves digital-only clients such as the Piedmont Exedra and SFGate.

References

External links
Official page for Bay City News Service
Official page for Bay City News Foundation
Official page for nonprofit affiliate news site LocalNewsMatter.org

News agencies based in the United States
Newspapers published in the San Francisco Bay Area
Mass media companies established in 1979